This self-titled EP by indie rock group Oxford Collapse was originally released in a limited pressing by the Hot Chubbs Records (HCR) label. It has since been available from Kanine Records and Sub Pop.

Track listing 

 "If It Dies in Peoria Then Who the Hell Cares?" – 3:19
 "Grasses of Anne" – 3:04
 "Sex Face" – 2:40
 "(Having a Blast In) Co-Op City" – 3:39
 "Melting the Ice Queen" – 6:54

References

 [ Allmusic album page]
 Kanine Records artist page
 Sub Pop album page

Oxford Collapse albums
2002 debut EPs